= 8/9 =

8/9 may refer to:

- August 9 (month-day date notation)
- September 8 (day-month date notation)
